Dinah, Yes Indeed! is a 1958 studio album by Dinah Shore, arranged by Nelson Riddle.

Track listing
 "It All Depends on You" (Ray Henderson, Buddy DeSylva, Lew Brown) – 2:36
 "Falling in Love with Love" (Richard Rodgers, Lorenz Hart) – 3:00
 Medley: "Where or When"/"Easy to Love"/"Get Out of Town"/"They Can't Take That Away from Me" (Rodgers, Hart)/(Cole Porter)/(Porter)/(George Gershwin, Ira Gershwin) – 5:38
 "Sentimental Journey" (Les Brown, Ben Homer, Bud Green) – 3:29
 "The One I Love (Belongs to Somebody Else)" (Isham Jones, Gus Kahn) – 3:02
 "I'm Old Fashioned" (Jerome Kern, Johnny Mercer) – 2:56
 "Our Love Is Here to Stay" (G. Gershwin, I. Gershwin) – 3:09
 "Taking a Chance on Love" (Vernon Duke, Ted Fetter, John La Touche) – 2:39
 "Yes Indeed!" (Sy Oliver) – 5:12

Personnel
Dinah Shore – vocals
Nelson Riddle – conductor, arranger

References

1958 albums
Dinah Shore albums
Albums produced by Voyle Gilmore
Capitol Records albums
Albums arranged by Nelson Riddle
Albums conducted by Nelson Riddle